Roy Trigg (born 29 April 1943, in Morden, Surrey) is a former motorcycle speedway rider. 

He was noticed as a teenager by the Wimbledon Dons management who signed him up but immediately loaned him out to lower league Poole Pirates. In 1964 the new Hackney Hawks promoter Len Silver signed him on a full transfer. He stayed with the Hawks for two seasons but was forced out of the team when Bengt Jansson was signed. 

After leaving the Hawks he spent a season with the Oxford Cheetahs before moving on to Cradley Heath where he spent the next five seasons. It was with Cradley he was threatened with a gun by Garry Middleton. Garry tried to forcefully dive under Roy but Roy saw him and slowed down, leaving Middleton to shoot straight past him into the safety fence. Middleton then went into the pits into his toolbox and pulled out a handgun. He had to be dragged from the pits to avoid further trouble. 

In 1970 he finished third in the British Speedway Championship final. For the last two seasons of his career Roy rode with Newport. After he retired he emigrated to New Zealand. Trigg rode as a New Zealander in the inaugural Australasian Final in 1976. He finished in 15th place with two points.

External links
Hackney Hawks Website

References

1943 births
Living people
British speedway riders
English motorcycle racers
Hackney Hawks riders
Cradley Heathens riders
Wimbledon Dons riders
Poole Pirates riders
Oxford Cheetahs riders
Newport Wasps riders
New Cross Rangers riders